The Second Wave: 25 Years of NWOBHM is a split studio album released in 2003 by British indie label Communiqué Records. The album contains five songs each from veteran bands of the new wave of British heavy metal Oliver/Dawson Saxon (resulting from a split of Saxon), Girlschool and Tygers of Pan Tang. The album features both new songs and already published ones, sometimes re-recorded for the occasion. The release of the album had to be followed by a UK tour of the three bands together, but Oliver/Dawson Saxon did not participate. The cover design was by Robb Weir's nephew and Vectis radio DJ, Tim Pritchard with Paris-based designer Kev Baldwyn. The painting used was commissioned by Robb Weir and painted by Isle of Wight-based artist, John Patty.

Track listing
"World's Gone Crazy" (Oliver/Dawson Saxon) - 5:32
"Passion" (Girlschool) - 3:06
"Love Potion No. 9 2003" (Tygers of Pan Tang) - 3:01
"Nursery Crimes" (Oliver/Dawson Saxon) - 5:08
"Mad Mad Sister" (Girlschool) - 3:51
"Godspeak" (Tygers of Pan Tang) - 5:56
"Räder Aus Stahl" (Oliver/Dawson Saxon) - 4:23
"Coming Your Way" (Girlschool) - 3:24
"Mystical" (Tygers of Pan Tang) - 4:54
"Broken" (Oliver/Dawson Saxon) - 6:45
"Believe" (Girlschool) - 3:29
"Hellbound 2003" (Tygers of Pan Tang) - 3:23
"Ghost" (Oliver/Dawson Saxon) - 5:07
"Innocent" (Girlschool) - 3:08
"Firepower" (Tygers of Pan Tang) - 4:42

Personnel

Oliver/Dawson Saxon
 John Ward - vocals
 Graham Oliver - guitar
 Haydn Conway - guitar
 Steve Dawson - bass
 Nigel Durham - drums

Girlschool
Kim McAuliffe – vocals, guitar
Jackie Chambers – lead guitar
Enid Williams – vocals, bass
Denise Dufort – drums

Tygers of Pan Tang
Richie Wicks - vocals
Robb Weir - guitar
Dean "Deano" Robertson - guitar 
Brian West - bass 
Craig Ellis - drums

References

Split albums
Girlschool albums
Tygers of Pan Tang albums
Oliver/Dawson Saxon albums
2003 compilation albums
New Wave of British Heavy Metal compilation albums